Access Bank Zambia, whose full name is Access Bank Zambia Limited, is a commercial bank in Zambia. It is licensed by the Bank of Zambia, the central bank and national banking regulator.

Location
The headquarters and main branch of Access Bank Zambia are located at 632 Cairo Road, in the city Lusaka, the capital city of Zambia. The geographical coordinates of the  headquarters of Access Bank Zambia are: 15°24'43.0"S, 28°16'49.0"E (Latitude:-15.411944; Longitude:28.280278).

Overview
The bank is a medium-sized retail bank, serving the needs of Zambian companies, small and medium sized enterprises and individuals.  Access Bank Zambia had assets valued at ZMW:1,569,171,000 (approximately US$80.64 million), with shareholders equity of ZMW:269.36 million (US$13.81 million).

The bank, which was established on the 24th of September 2008, is a subsidiary of Access Bank Group, an international bank that maintains headquarters in Nigeria and has subsidiaries in eight countries in Africa one country in Western Europe.

Access Bank Group
By virtue of its shareholding, Access Bank Zambia is a member of the Access Bank Group, a financial services conglomerate, whose shares are listed on the Nigerian Stock Exchange and whose total asset valuation exceeded US$18.82 billion (NGN:7.28 trillion), as of June 2020.

The group has banking subsidiaries in Democratic Republic of the Congo, Gambia, Ghana, Kenya, Nigeria, Rwanda, Sierra Leone and the United Kingdom. The group maintains representative offices in Lebanon, United Arab Emirates, India and China.

Branches
The branches of Access Bank Zambia include the following:
 Cairo Road Branch: 632 Cairo Road, Lusaka
 Longacres Branch: 2166 Haile Selassie Avenue, Longacres, Lusaka
 Acacia Park Branch: Acacia Park, 22768 Thabo Mbeki Road, Lusaka
 Makeni Mall: Shop 50, Makeni Mall, 38388 Kafue Road, Lusaka
 Ndola Branch: 3055 Mpelembe House, Ndola
 Kitwe Branch: 493/494 Union House, Kitwe.

Acquisition of Cavmont Bank
In August 2020 Access Bank Zambia entered into a binding commitment to acquire the entire issued ordinary share capital, assets and liabilities of Cavmont Bank, another Zambian commercial bank. The transaction, which requires regulatory and shareholder approval, is expected to close in Q4 of 2020.

Merger with Atlas Mara Bank Zambia
In October 2021, Access Bank Zambia signed binding agreements to merge with Atlas Mara Bank Zambia Limited. The transaction which requires regulatory approval in Nigeria and Zambia, is expected to conclude in 2022. The merger of Access Bank Zambia and Cavmont Bank was concluded in 2000.

It is anticipated that when the merger with Atlas Mara Bank Zambia is concluded, Access Bank Zambia's total assets will exceed US$1 billion, with over 300,000 customer accounts and 70 branches and baking agencies.

See also

 List of banks in Zambia
 Bank of Zambia
 Access Bank Rwanda

References

External links
 Website of Access Bank Zambia
  Website of Bank of Zambia

Banks of Zambia
Banks established in 2008
2008 establishments in Zambia
Companies based in Lusaka
Access Bank Group